Buying Naked is an American reality television that premiered on TLC, on November 20, 2013. The show follows real estate agent Jackie Youngblood as she shows homes in clothing optional communities to house-hunting nudists.

Episodes

Pilot episodes (2013)

Season 1 (2014)

References

General references

External links
 
 

2010s American reality television series
2013 American television series debuts
TLC (TV network) original programming
Nudity in television
2014 American television series endings